Alpine valley may refer to:
 Any valley of the Alps
 The Alpine Valleys wine region of Australia
 Alpine Valley Music Theatre, an amphitheater in East Troy, Wisconsin
 Alpine Valley Resort (Wisconsin), a ski resort located near Alpine Valley Music Theatre
 Alpine Valley Ski Area, a ski area in Ohio
 Vallis Alpes, a valley in the Montes Alpes on the Moon